Omer Verschoore (2 December 1888 – 6 June 1931) was a Belgian racing cyclist. He won the Belgian national road race title in 1912.

References

External links

1888 births
1931 deaths
Belgian male cyclists
Cyclists from West Flanders
People from Moorslede